TU9 German Universities of Technology e. V. is the alliance of nine leading Technical Universities in Germany. The current president of TU9 is Wolfram Ressel, rector of the University of Stuttgart.

Overview 
TU9 was established in 2003 as an informal consortium of those Institutes of Technology in Germany which were established before 1900. The founding president of TU9 is Horst Hippler, also president of the University of Karlsruhe. The registered association ("e. V.") TU9 German Institutes of Technology e. V. was solemnly founded on January 26, 2006 at TU Braunschweig. Its head office is in Berlin. The following presidents (or their representatives) attended foundation and signed the certificate of incorporation:

 Konstantin Meskouris, prorector of RWTH Aachen
 Jörg Steinbach, vice president of TU Berlin
 Jürgen Hesselbach, president of TU Braunschweig
Johann-Dietrich Wörner, president of TU Darmstadt
 Hermann Kokenge, rector of TU Dresden
 Erich Barke, president of Leibniz University Hannover
 Horst Hippler, rector of Karlsruhe Institute of Technology
 Wolfgang A. Herrmann, president of the Technical University of Munich
 Dieter Fritsch, rector of University of Stuttgart

The mission of this organization is to act as contact for society, economy and politics, particularly for the university education of engineers. The members of TU9 mutually accredit their bachelor's and master's degrees and, therefore, support the progression of the Bologna process and quality assurance concerning university education of engineers.

Policy on higher education 
Associated especially through their core subjects, the engineering sciences, the members of TU9 pay attention particularly to the public perception of topics with high relevance to these sciences. This includes analysis of statistics about third-party funds and the description of the importance of the TU9 universities concerning graduates.

Position in Germany 
According to the research report 2018 of the German Research Foundation (DFG), TU9 universities are among the universities with the highest third-party funding in Germany. They received more than one-fifth (21%) of all DFG grants across all scientific disciplines. The TU Dresden received the highest number of DFG grants in electrical engineering, the TU Darmstadt in computer science and the RWTH Aachen in mechanical engineering. In a competitive selection process, the DFG selects the best research projects from researchers at universities and research institutes and finances them. The ranking is thus regarded as an indicator of the quality of research. In the profile area of engineering, almost 50% of the DFG funding volume goes to TU9 universities. Almost a quarter of all recipients of a European Research Council grant, the highest endowed science prize of the European Union, preferred one of the TU9 universities. RWTH Aachen and TU Darmstadt are among the universities with the highest number of top managers in the German economy. They belong to the top 3 universities. Five of the eleven German Universities of Excellence are TU9 universities (RWTH Aachen, TU Berlin, TU Dresden, KIT, and TU Munich). Three of the five German National Competence Centers for Artificial Intelligence at universities are based at TU9 universities (TU Berlin, TU Dresden, and TU Munich).

Members 
 RWTH Aachen
 TU Berlin
 TU Braunschweig
 TU Darmstadt
 TU Dresden
 Leibniz University Hannover
 Karlsruhe Institute of Technology
 TU Munich
 University of Stuttgart

See also 
 U15 – association of fifteen largest universities in Germany (not including technical universities)
 Golden Triangle (English universities) – a group of leading English universities
 Russell Group – a group of research-based universities in the United Kingdom
 C9 League – The Chinese Ministry of Education's formal grouping of elite universities in China
 UAS7 - strategic alliance of seven leading German Universities of Applied Sciences
 Taiwan Comprehensive University System - an alliance with TU9 has a transnational partnership

References

External links 
 

College and university associations and consortia in Germany
Technical universities and colleges in Germany
RWTH Aachen University
Technical University of Braunschweig
Technische Universität Darmstadt
Karlsruhe Institute of Technology
University of Hanover
University of Stuttgart
Technical University of Berlin
2003 establishments in Germany
Organizations established in 2003